Barbara Frum is a Canadian talk show which aired on CBC Television between October 1974 and July 1975. Barbara Frum interviewed various guests including Michael Magee, Charlotte Gobeil, Paul Rimstead, Allan Fotheringham, and Jack Webster and in the premiere episode her guests included Roman Gralewicz, the President of the Seafarers' International Union, and, for a surprise appearance, Gerda Munsinger, the woman at the centre of a 1966 scandal (the Munsinger Affair) that involved Cabinet Minister Pierre Sévigny.

External links
 Barbara Frum at Canadian Communications Foundation
 Barbara Frum at TVArchive.ca

1974 Canadian television series debuts
1975 Canadian television series endings
CBC Television original programming
1970s Canadian television talk shows